The Lussich Arboretum is an arboretum of  located in the Maldonado Department of Uruguay near Punta del Este and Punta Ballena.

History 
The next year Antonio Lussich started the forestry works which had as objective on one hand, to forest the dry lands in an attempt to stop the high winds that came from the ocean, and on the other, once the forest was established, to encourage birds to inhabit it. 
In order to do that, Antonio Lussich, thanks to the enterprise of maritime rescue contracts obtained all over the world, could manage to get seeds from numerous continents. He bought seeds, plants and trees from around the world and planted them around his house.
The first trees planted were Tamarix, sea pines, Eucalyptus and Acacia trinervis to resist the strong winds and sand.

During December 1979,  was donated to the Municipality of Maldonado and then opened to the public. The Lussich Arboretum is one of the most important Forest Reserves in the world.

Species 

The Lussich Arboretum has more than 400 exotic species and around 70 Uruguayan species.

Between many of the trees species, the most important are:

 Abies, 6 species.
 Acacia, 8 species.
 Cupressus, 9 species.
 Eucalyptus, 45 species.
 Juniperus, 10 species.
 Pinus, 20 species.
 Quercus, 16 species.
 Thuja, 4 species.

See also
 Antonio Lussich

References 

Arboreta
Trees of Uruguay
Parks in Uruguay
Maldonado Department